Tendrils were an irregular collaboration between two Australian guitarists, Joel Silbersher of Hoss and Charlie Owen of Beasts of Bourbon. The music of Tendrils is characterized by two chaotic yet complementary guitar parts and occasional stripped-back percussion. In 1995, billed simply as "Joel Silbersher and Charlie Owen", they issued an album, Tendrils. It was produced by Spencer P. Jones and recorded at Atlantis Studios, Melbourne. Drums were provided by Greg Bainbridge on three tracks and Todd McNeair on one track.

For the second album, Soaking Red (1998), they used Tendrils as the band's name. Owen played guitars, pedal bass, piano, organ, percussion, mandolin, banjo, bass recorder, backing vocals on one track and drums on another; Silbersher supplied vocals, guitars, drums, harmonica, and incidental keyboards; Jim White provided additional drumming on one track. It was produced by Dave McLuney, Owen and Silbersher and mixed at Atlantis studios. Soaking Red was nominated for at the ARIA Music Awards of 1999 for Best Alternative Release. In April 1999 they advertised an intention to tour overseas. In November 2011 Tendrils supported a gig by Gareth Liddiard.

Discography

Awards and nominations

ARIA Music Awards
The ARIA Music Awards is an annual awards ceremony that recognises excellence, innovation, and achievement across all genres of Australian music. They commenced in 1987.

! 
|-
|1999
| Soaking Red
| ARIA Award for Best Adult Alternative Album
| 
|
|-

References

External links 

  archived from the original on 22 April 2003. Retrieved 16 November 2015.
 "Poster advertising performance by Tendrils at The Continental Café, Prahran, Victoria", performance due on 22 April 1999, picture held at State Library of Victoria.

Tendrils